Clara Marian Wagner (11 November 1891 – 30 December 1961) was one of the first documented woman motorcyclists, who became notable as an endurance racer and was sponsored by the Eclipse Machine Co., a bicycle company, for using its braking products.

In 1907, Wagner, aged 15 years old and the daughter of the Wagner Motorcycle Company (1901-1914 ) owner George Wagner from Saint Paul, Minnesota, became a member of the American Federation of Motorcyclists (FAM).

Clara Wagner put the company's motorcycles on the map by achieving a perfect score in a FAM 360 mile endurance race from Chicago to Indianapolis in 1910, aged 18, but was denied the trophy because she was female.  She won several such events.

At the time, Wagner was celebrated on a series of postcards as "The most successful and experienced lady motorcyclist" and rode one of the first motorcycles designed specifically for women.

References

 Women motorcyclists
1891 births
1961 deaths

hola